The Pilot's Wife : A Novel is a 1998 novel by Anita Shreve.  It is chronologically the third novel in Shreve's informal trilogy to be set in a large beach house on the New Hampshire coast that used to be a convent. It is preceded by Fortune's Rocks and Sea Glass.

The novel was chosen as an Oprah's Book Club selection for March 1999.

Plot summary
The novel is about Kathryn Lyons, whose husband, Jack Lyons, dies in a plane crash over the Atlantic Ocean off the coast of Malin Head, Ireland. As she and her daughter Mattie try to cope with this sudden loss, she finds herself bombarded by the press. While she and the airlines try to find the reason for the crash, she slowly unravels a series of secrets her husband has kept from her until she realizes that he lived a double life she never knew about.

Adaptation
The novel was adapted into a made-for-TV movie in 2002 on CBS.

References

External links
The book's page on Oprah's Book Club website
IMDB listing of TV movie

1998 American novels
Novels set in New Hampshire
American novels adapted into films
American novels adapted into television shows